Eros Pagni (born 28 August 1939) is an Italian actor and voice actor.

Biography
Born in La Spezia, at the age of 17, Pagni started attending the Silvio d'Amico National Academy of Dramatic Arts in Rome and then went back to Genoa and played roles in works by William Shakespeare, Molière, Eugene O'Neill, Luigi Pirandello and more.

As a film actor, Pagni has appeared in more than 30 films since 1964. He is well known for his role in Dario Argento's Deep Red and for his collaboration with Lina Wertmüller in films such as Love and Anarchy, Swept Away and All Screwed Up.

He received with all the cast of Ettore Scola's The Dinner the Nastro d'Argento Award for Best Supporting Actor.

Occasionally, Pagni is also a voice actor. He is notable for having dubbed actors like Aldo Ray in The Green Berets, R. Lee Ermey in Full Metal Jacket and Christopher Lee in Gremlins 2: The New Batch and animated characters such as Judge Claude Frollo from The Hunchback of Notre Dame and Master Shifu in the Kung Fu Panda film series.

Selected filmography

 Pleasant Nights (1966)
 Il generale dorme in piedi (1972)
 Love and Anarchy (1973)
 Swept Away (1974)
 All Screwed Up (1974)
 Processo per direttissima (1974)
 Deep Red (1975)
 Soldier of Fortune (1976)
 I nuovi mostri (1977)
 Goodnight, Ladies and Gentlemen (1978)
 Liquirizia (1979)
 Hypochondriac (1979)
 Odd Squad (1981)
 Grog (1982)
 Flirt (1983)	
 Teresa (1987)
 Red American (1991)
 The Storm Is Coming (1993)
 The Dinner (1998)
 Love Returns (2004)
 Family Game (2007)
 Amici miei – Come tutto ebbe inizio (2011)
 Put Grandma in the Freezer (2018)

Dubbing roles

Animation
Claude Frollo in The Hunchback of Notre Dame
Master Shifu in Kung Fu Panda
Master Shifu in Kung Fu Panda 2
Master Shifu in Kung Fu Panda 3
Tzekel-Kan in The Road to El Dorado

Live action
Gunnery Sergeant Hartman in Full Metal Jacket
The Governor in A Violent Life
Doctor Catheter in Gremlins 2: The New Batch
Maître Martin in Les Rois maudits
Ezra Goldman in Ray Donovan

References

External links

 
 
 

1939 births
Living people
People from La Spezia
Italian male film actors
Italian male stage actors
Italian male television actors
Italian male voice actors
Accademia Nazionale di Arte Drammatica Silvio D'Amico alumni
Nastro d'Argento winners
20th-century Italian male actors